"Catfish" is a 1976 soul song by the Four Tops. Released as a single on ABC Records, it was the title track of the album of the same name. The track features a disco sound reminiscent of contemporary musical groups. In the United States, "Catfish" reached 71 on the Billboard Hot 100 pop singles chart and number 7 on the R&B singles chart. By the release of "Catfish" in 1976, the Four Tops popularity had begun to decline.

References

1976 singles
1976 songs
Four Tops songs
Disco songs
ABC Records singles